Tibor Garay (born 1 January 1923) is a Hungarian retired professional football player. He made two appearances for Inter.

References

1923 births
Possibly living people
Hungarian footballers
Szeged LC footballers
Hungarian expatriate footballers
Expatriate footballers in Italy
Hungarian expatriate sportspeople in Italy
Serie A players
Inter Milan players
Aurora Pro Patria 1919 players
Rimini F.C. 1912 players
Expatriate footballers in France
Ligue 2 players
Toulouse FC players
Association football midfielders
Sportspeople from Szeged